Islampura Jabbar is a town in Tehsil Gujar Khan, in Rawalpindi District, in Punjab, Pakistan.

Facilities
The town has a Jamia Masjid, a post office, a boys higher secondary school and a girls higher secondary school. There are around 1,500 shops and 4 banks.
Lots food places . Pizza burgers etc.
Have few schools for boys and girl.
Every year there have mela (fair) under the name of baba sain mirchoo. 5/6/7 of march were there have kabadi matches horse dance bull race and many more free food for the travellers and local community in darbarr.

Near by Villages
The surrounding villages are Qazian, Manjotha, Pandori, Jabber Jattan, Pandori Bangyal, Goleen, Banair Kaswal, Doke Kallaryan, Dhok Shairoo, Dhok Hashmat Ali, Muhree and Rahura (Ratalla), Muhara Bhuttian, Dhoke Jari, lass, Malik Pur, Sohwa Mirza, Sadqa bhad, Peem, Baliham, Jameel Pura, Qadir Bakhs, Dhok Sir, Chani, Muhra Sha, Darkal, Kajoor, Mianii borgi malot pakhra, Malot Kaswal, Jabbar Village, Paleena and its small villages like Thathi, Thigri, Luss, Meira etc.

References
Populated places in Gujar Khan Tehsil
Union councils of Gujar Khan Tehsil